The 2001 Speedway World Cup (SWC) was the 1st FIM Speedway World Cup season (and 42nd edition of a speedway team World Cup). The Final took place on 7 July 2008 in Wrocław, Poland. The tournament was won by Australia (68 points) and they beat host team Poland (65 pts), Sweden (51 pts), Denmark (44 pts) and United States (30 pts) in the Final.

Qualification

The two group winners and runners-up qualified to 2001 Speedway World Cup.

Venues

Two cities were selected to host SWC finals events:

Tournament

Qualifying rounds

Race-off

Last chance
 2001-07-05
  Wrocław, Olympic Stadium
 Referee:  Wojciech Grodzki

Final

The Final
 2001-07-07
  Wrocław, Olympic Stadium
 Referee:  Anthony Steele

Final classification

See also
2001 Speedway Grand Prix

References

External links
 www.speedwayworld.tv - World Cup webside

 
World T
2001